Al-Arafah is a sub-district located in al-Saddah District, Ibb Governorate, Yemen. Al-Arafah had a population of 7,023 according to the 2004 census.

References 

Sub-districts in As Saddah District